Hội An Wreck lies 22 miles off the coast of central Vietnam in the South China Sea, at  approximately. Between 1996 and 1999, the team that included the Vietnamese National Salvage Corporation and Oxford University’s Marine Archaeology Research Division, recovered nearly three hundred thousand artifacts.

History
The ship was carrying a large cargo of Vietnamese ceramics dated to the mid- to late 15th century. The provenance of the pieces was known to be the kilns of the Red River Delta (such as Chu Dau) because excavations in the region had been ongoing since their discovery in 1983. The only pieces remaining at the kiln sites were faults pieces. Intact examples of the wares produced were rare, since all were exported. When the wreck was found there was excitement among collectors and archaeologists, for it promised the first cargo consisting solely of Vietnamese wares.

The wreck was discovered by fishermen around the early 1990s.  For several years the site was intensively plundered resulting in pieces turning up on the market all over the world.  The method employed by the looters was to drag a series of hooks across the site with nets behind the catch to dislodge artefacts.The Vietnamese authorities became aware of the wreck following the arrest of two dealers at Da Nang airport who had in their possession suitcases full of pottery from the site. The wreck was beyond standard diving depth, but something had to be done quickly to prevent further looting.  

In 1996, Malaysian-Chinese businessman Ong Soo Hin teamed up with Oxford University archaeologist Mensun Bound to work with Vietnam's National History Museum in excavating the site, with York Archaeological Trust providing conservation and photographic services. The project took four years and cost an estimated $US14 million. Over 250,000 intact ceramic artefacts were recovered.

Over three seasons the team excavated a third of a million pieces of pottery. Most of the pottery was repetitive everyday table ware of little artistic value but there were also items of outstanding artistry.  An ‘Evaluation Committee’ of leading Vietnamese archaeologists and art historians selected all the unique pieces for the National Collection in Hanoi and then other museums were invited to select what they wished.  Six museums in Vietnam now host permanent exhibitions of material from the wreck. 

The remaining 90% was sold at auction in 2000 by Butterfields in San Francisco, USA with the Vietnamese Salvage Agency, Saga Horizon and the Vietnamese Ministry of Culture dividing any money made. Part of the proceeds were used to pay for the display, curation and study of the selection that went into the National Collection. The project partners were: Oxford University MARE, Saga Horizon, Vietnam National Salvage Agency (VISAL) and the National History Museum (Hanoi).

See also
Archaeology of shipwrecks
Maritime archaeology
List of shipwrecks
Marine salvage
Wreck diving
Vũng Tàu shipwreck

Notes

References
Vietnamese Ceramics from the Hoi An Excavation: The Cu Lao Cham Ship Cargo. John Guy, Orientations, sept. 2000The Maritime Archaeology of Shipwrecks and Ceramics in Southeast Asia.'' J Green and R Harper
—Narrative account of the salvage by one of the team members

External links
Hoi An world heritage website
Phố cổ Hội An 

Archaeology of shipwrecks
Shipwrecks in the South China Sea
Archaeology of Vietnam